Self-Destructive Pattern is the third album by the American industrial metal band Spineshank. It was released on September 9, 2003 by Roadrunner Records. The single "Smothered" was nominated for a Grammy in the category of Best Metal Performance (2004).

Track listing
All lyrics by Tommy Decker and Jonny Santos. 
All music by Tommy Decker and Mike Sarkisyan.
 "Violent Mood Swings" – 3:29
 "Slavery" – 2:55
 "Smothered" – 3:07
 "Consumed (Obsessive Compulsive)" – 3:06
 "Beginning of the End" – 3:32
 "Forgotten" – 3:19
 "Self-Destructive Pattern" – 3:16
 "Tear Me Down" – 3:42
 "Stillborn" – 4:15
 "Falls Apart" – 2:56
 "Fallback" – 3:15
 "Dead to Me" – 3:36

B-sides
 "Infected" – 4:15 (bonus track for Japanese edition)
 "On Deaf Ears" – 3:37 (appears on Roadrunner Roadrage 2003 sampler)
 "Don't Look Back" – 3:37 (appears on studio recording video in low quality)

Personnel

Musicians
 Jonny Santos – vocals
 Mike Sarkisyan – guitar, co-producer, assistant digital editor
 Robert Garcia – bass, backing vocals
 Tommy Decker – drums, electronics, programming, co-producer, assistant digital editor

Credits
 GGGarth – Producer
 Ted Jensen – Mastering
 Frank Gryner – Engineering, Recording, Additional programming
 Scott Humphrey – Engineering, Recording, Additional programming
 Brad Kane – Additional Vocals
 Jay Baumgardner – Mixing
 Mark Kiczula – Assistant mixer
 Ben "Game Over" Kaplan – Digital editing
 Jeff Rothschild – Assistant digital editor
 Anthony "Fu" Valcic – Assistant digital editor

Other media
The songs "Beginning of the End" and "Slavery" were featured in the 2003 film Freddy vs. Jason, but only "Beginning of the End" was featured on the soundtrack.

Charts

References

2003 albums
Roadrunner Records albums
Spineshank albums
Albums produced by Garth Richardson